The round whipray (Maculabatis pastinacoides) is a species of stingray in the family Dasyatidae.
It is found in the Indo-Malay Archipelago including Java, Sumatra and Borneo.

References

Compagno, L.J.V., 1999. Checklist of living elasmobranchs. p. 471-498. In W.C. Hamlett (ed.) Sharks, skates, and rays: the biology of elasmobranch fishes. Johns Hopkins University Press, Maryland.

Maculabatis
Taxa named by Pieter Bleeker
Fish described in 1852